The Seven Sisters ( or , also known as ) is the 39th tallest waterfall in Norway.

The waterfall is located along the Geirangerfjorden in Stranda Municipality in Møre og Romsdal county, Norway. The waterfall is located just south of the historic Knivsflå farm, across the fjord from the old Skageflå farm. It is part of the Geiranger World Heritage Site.

Name
"The Seven Sisters" ( or ) is located on the northern side of Geirangerfjorden, and directly across the fjord lies a single waterfall called "The Suitor".  The legend of the seven sisters is that they dance playfully down the mountain.  Meanwhile, across the fjord, the suitor (or courter) flirts playfully with them from afar.

References

External links

 UNESCO Heritage
 Seven Sisters Waterfall - No. 1 in Best Places To See and Take Photos in Norway

Stranda
Waterfalls of Møre og Romsdal